Elemental is a compilation album by Demdike Stare, released on February 27, 2012 by Modern Love Records. It compiles the group's last three EPs, including Chrysanthe & Violetta, Rose and Iris.

Track listing

Personnel
Adapted from the Elemental liner notes.

Demdike Stare
 Sean Canty – producer
 Miles Whittaker – producer

Production and additional personnel
 Radu Prepeleac – design
 Andy Votel – cover art

Release history

References

External links 
 

2012 compilation albums
Demdike Stare albums
Instrumental compilation albums
Modern Love Records albums